Son is a 2021 Irish-American horror thriller film written and directed by Ivan Kavanagh and starring Emile Hirsch, Andi Matichak, and Luke David Blumm.

Premise
Having escaped from a cult as a child, a mother must face her past when its sinister members break into her home and attempt to steal her eight-year old son, David. Now the two are on the run pursued by a detective determined to save them both. Since his aborted kidnapping, something has changed in David and the boy has succumbed to a mysterious illness. Following her maternal instincts to save him, his mother commits unspeakable acts to keep him alive but is losing the battle. Soon, she has to decide how far she is willing to go to save her son.

Cast
Andi Matichak as Laura
Emile Hirsch as Paul
Luke David Blumm as David
Cranston Johnson as Steve
Blaine Maye as  Jimmy Naegle
J. Robert Spencer as Dr. Bauhn
Rocco Sisto as Dr. Bradlee
Kristine Nielsen Mrs Naegle
Erin Bradley Dangar as Susan
Adam Stephenson as Father
David Kallaway as Pimp

Production
Filming occurred in February 2020.

Release
RLJE Films acquired the distribution rights for the film, which was released on March 5, 2021.

Reception
On Rotten Tomatoes, the film has an approval rating of 76% based on reviews from 42 critics, with an average rating of 6.40/10 with its consensus stating, "A horror story with unexpected emotional resonance, Son uses its familial focus to counter a certain queasy familiarity".

References

External links
 

2021 films
2021 horror thriller films
Irish horror thriller films
American horror thriller films
English-language Irish films
2020s English-language films
2020s American films